The 1952 United States presidential election in Pennsylvania took place on November 4, 1952 as part of the 1952 United States presidential election. Voters chose 32 representatives, or electors to the Electoral College, who voted for president and vice president.

Pennsylvania voted for the Republican nominee, war hero General Dwight D. Eisenhower, over the Democratic nominee, Illinois Governor Adlai Stevenson. Eisenhower won Pennsylvania by a margin of 5.89%.

Despite Thomas Dewey's relatively strong showing in Philadelphia County in 1948, Eisenhower became the first Republican ever to win the White House without carrying Allegheny or Philadelphia Counties, which had been Republican strongholds prior to the New Deal.

This was the first election since 1868 in which Pennsylvania voted more Democratic than the nation. It would continue to do so in every election thereafter until 2016.

Results

Results by county

See also
 List of United States presidential elections in Pennsylvania

References

Pennsylvania
1952
1952 Pennsylvania elections